Algar may refer to:

Places
Algar, Cádiz, a city in Andalusia, Spain
Algar, India, a settlement in Uttara Kannada district, Karnataka, India
Algar de Mesa, a municipality in the province of Guadalajara, Castile-La Mancha, Spain
Algar de Palancia, a municipality in the comarca of Camp de Morvedre in the Valencian Community, Spain
El Algar, a district of the Spanish municipality Cartagena
Algar do Carvão, an ancient lava tube or volcanic vent in the center of the island of Terceira in the Azores
Bnied Al-Gar, a suburb of Kuwait City
Algar Court, an alleyway in Sai Ying Pun, Hong Kong

People
Ben Algar, an English footballer, who currently plays for F.C. New York
Hamid Algar, a British-American Professor Emeritus of Persian Studies at the University of California
James Algar, an American film director, screenwriter, and producer
Luis Herrero-Tejedor Algar, a Spanish politician and Member of the European Parliament
Michael Algar, aka Olga, an English guitarist and singer and songwriter
Niamh Algar, Irish actor
Ralph Algar, MP
Algar Howard, a long-serving officer of arms at the College of Arms in London
Algars Kirkis, a Soviet luger who competed during the late 1970s
Ælfgar of Selwood, or Algar, a saint venerated at a chapel in Somerset, England
Algar (thane), one of twenty Saxon thanes in Devonshire who survived the Norman Conquest in 1066

Companies
Algar Telecom, a Brazilian telecommunications company

See also
Algar-Flynn-Oyamada reaction, a chemical reaction whereby a chalcone undergoes an oxidative cyclization to form a flavonol
Ælfgar (disambiguation)